Heroic Silence (Spanish: Silencio sublime) is a 1935 Mexican drama film directed by Ramón Peón. It stars Alfredo del Diestro, Leopoldo "Chato" Ortín, and Adria Delhort.

The film was produced by La Mexicana and Elaboradora de Películas.

Plot
A poor man is imprisoned, but manages to flee just on the day of his daughter's wedding.

Cast
Alfredo del Diestro as Antonio Rodríguez
Leopoldo "Chato" Ortín as Tomás García (as Polo Ortín)
Adria Delhort as Dolores
Aurora del Real as Lupita
Emma Roldán as Teresa
René Cardona as Ricardo
Estela Ametler as Doña Leonor
Carlos López as El Pescado
Miguel Arenas as Don Guillermo
Fanny Schiller as Modista
Manuel Noriega as Manuel, cantinero
Estela Alicia Epstein as Lupita niña
Gerardo del Castillo as José López El Seco
José Escanero as Agente de policía
José Ignacio Rocha as Agente de policía, preso
Carlos L. Cabello as Preso
Chel López as Preso
Felipe de Flores as Invitado a la boda
Fausto Alvarez as Preso cantante

References

External links
 

1935 films
Mexican drama films
1935 drama films
Films directed by Ramón Peón
1930s Spanish-language films

Mexican black-and-white films
1930s Mexican films